Oasis Charitable Trust, commonly known as Oasis, is a UK-based Christian registered charity.  It was founded by the Reverend Steve Chalke in September 1985. Chalke had been assistant minister at Tonbridge Baptist Church, Kent, for four years. He left this job with the aim of setting up a hostel for homeless young people. Oasis now has over 5,000 staff in the UK as well as thousands more volunteers.

Since its foundation Oasis has also developed into a family of charities now working on four continents (11 countries) around the world, with the goal of delivering housing, education, training, youthwork and healthcare.  Oasis is now a significant voluntary sector provider, delivering services for local authorities and national governments, as well as self funded initiatives.

Oasis currently works in 51 local neighbourhoods – 35 of which are in the UK.

Oasis Church Waterloo

In 2003, under Steve Chalke's leadership, Oasis, having become responsible for the buildings of Christ Church and Upton Chapel, in Waterloo, central London, worked with the existing members there to form what was initially known as Church.co.uk.  Since then it has been renamed as Oasis Church, Waterloo.

Christ Church and Upton Chapel was founded as Surrey Chapel in 1783, and was to provide a major influence in the start of the ragged school movement – which provided schools for local children from poor homes – and also supported the birth of the Shaftesbury Society, the YMCA and the Bible Society.  In the 1800s it was also influential in the anti-slavery movement; William Wilberforce and friends made its building a venue for many of their anti-slavery meetings, and its spire, built in 1867, is named the Lincoln Tower, donated in memory of Abraham Lincoln who was both inspired and supported by in his work to achieve the emancipation of the slaves of North America through the network of friends based in London.

Since 2003 a wide range of community services focussed on the half-mile radius around the building, have been developed including a children's centre, a primary school, a secondary school, various adult education opportunities, a foodbank, a debt advice centre, a community farm, a coffee shop, as well as becoming responsible for the local public library and launching various other youth projects and programmes.

Further Oasis churches have developed running alongside the communities of Oasis Academies in Salford, Oldham, Brightstowe, Bristol, Enfield, Southampton (Lord's Hill & Mayfield), Immingham and Wintringham.

The Oasis church network has five values which are at the heart of their work: inclusion, interdependence, intimacy, involvement and influence.

Stop The Traffik
Stop The Traffik is one of the Oasis subsidiary charities. It is a global coalition working in nearly 100 countries and in partnership with multiple other charitable organisations, businesses and anti-trafficking agencies with the goal of disrupting and preventing human trafficking.

Oasis Community Housing
Oasis Community Housing delivers bespoke and effective services for vulnerably housed and homeless people, in the North East as well as in South London. Annually it supports over 1000 people with housing needs.

The Oasis Foundation
The Foundation focuses on commissioning and disseminating research, on informing and influencing social policy but, most importantly, on promoting and supporting the role of local churches in public service delivery as an integrated part of their purpose.

Oasis Community Learning
Oasis Community Learning is a multi-academy trust and one of Oasis Trust's subsidiary charities. It has an UID of 4076  It acts as an umbrella group to govern the Oasis Academies which are schools classed as academies. The first three Oasis academies in Enfield Lock, Grimsby and Immingham, opened in September 2007, with six more, two in Bristol, two in Southampton, two in Croydon and one in Salford, opening in September 2008. Since then, Oasis has grown to be one of the country's largest Multi-Academy Trusts (MATs) and is currently responsible for 53 schools around England; a mix of primary, secondary and all-through academies.

The trust have guided forty schools out of special measures. Chalke says "Turning round a school is sometimes a quick fix, it really, truly is. And sometimes it’s a really long, hard, hard job". A few schools have been problematic for decades, according to Chalke.

Oasis has a long-term strategy for enhancing the performance of its schools. Firstly it has devised a standard curriculum, that each school can safely adopt knowing it will deliver the National Curriculum. Secondly it has invested in staff training so they are focused on improving the outcomes for the students, and thirdly, through its Horizons scheme it is providing each member of staff and student with a tablet.

Oasis academies

Primary

 Oasis Academy Aspinal, Gorton, Manchester
 Oasis Academy Bank Leaze, Bristol
 Oasis Academy Blakenhale Infants, Garretts Green, Birmingham
 Oasis Academy Blakenhale Junior, Garretts Green, Birmingham
 Oasis Academy Boulton, Soho, Birmingham
 Oasis Academy Broadoak, Ashton-under-Lyne, Tameside
 Oasis Academy Byron, Coulsdon, London
 Oasis Academy Connaught, Knowle, Bristol
 Oasis Academy Firvale, Sheffield
 Oasis Academy Foundry, Soho, Birmingham
 Oasis Academy Harpur Mount, Harpurhey, Manchester
 Oasis Academy Henderson Avenue, Scunthorpe
 Oasis Academy Hobmoor, Yardley, Birmingham
 Oasis Academy Johanna, Lower Marsh, London
 Oasis Academy Limeside, Limeside, Oldham
 Oasis Academy Long Cross, Bristol
 Oasis Academy Marksbury Road, Bristol
 Oasis Academy New Oak, Bristol
 Oasis Academy Nunsthorpe, Grimsby
 Oasis Academy Parkwood, Scunthorpe
 Oasis Academy Pinewood, Collier Row, London
 Oasis Academy Putney, London
 Oasis Academy Ryelands, South Norwood, London
 Oasis Academy Short Heath, Erdington, Birmingham
 Oasis Academy Skinner Street, Gillingham
 Oasis Academy Warndon, Worcester
 Oasis Academy Watermead, Sheffield
 Oasis Academy Woodview, Edgbaston, Birmingham

Secondary

 Oasis Academy Arena, South Norwood, London
 Oasis Academy Brightstowe, Shirehampton, Bristol
 Oasis Academy Brislington, Brislington, Bristol
 Oasis Academy Coulsdon, Old Coulsdon, London
 Oasis Academy Enfield, Enfield Lock, London
 Oasis Academy Immingham, Immingham
 Oasis Academy Isle of Sheppey, Isle of Sheppey, Kent
 Oasis Academy John Williams, Hengrove, Bristol
 Oasis Academy Leesbrook, Oldham
 Oasis Academy Lister Park, Bradford
 Oasis Academy Lord's Hill, Southampton
 Oasis Academy Mayfield, Southampton
 Oasis Academy MediaCityUK, Salford Quays, Salford
 Oasis Academy Oldham, Hollinwood, Oldham
 Oasis Academy Sholing, Southampton
 Oasis Academy Silvertown, West Silvertown
 Oasis Academy South Bank, Lambeth, London 
 Oasis Academy Wintringham, Grimsby

Under construction
 Oasis Academy Temple Quarter, Bristol

All-through
 Oasis Academy Don Valley, Attercliffe, Sheffield
 Oasis Academy Hadley, Ponders End, London
 Oasis Academy Shirley Park, Woodside, London

Oasis Horizons
Horizons is a scheme to upskill each adult and child in the Oasis Community Learning group by loaning them an Apple iPad tablet so they can access enhanced on-line learning both together in class and at home.
Oasis explains that this
 addresses the inequality agenda
 allows Oasis to develop a more exciting curriculum taking advantage of hundreds of online apps
 allows staff to work more efficiency, reducing the time needed to perform routine tasks
 allows students and families to access resources at home involving families to be more involved in the students education.
 prepares students for the next stage in their careers or in employment.

Oasis Restore
Oasis took over the management of the Medway Secure Training Centre (Medway Children's Prison) from G4S and HM Prisons Service; the facility was scheduled to  reopen in March 2021. The focus will be on rehabilitation not retaliation and the children and young people will be called students, not prisoners or inmates. Through education and a co-curriculum, Oasis hopes to develop a pathway for them towards that day that they can follow after they leave. There will be capacity for 64 students aged between 12 and 17 who may be staying from a few days to several years.

In June 2019 the Ministry of Justice announced that they had awarded Oasis the long-term contract to run the UK's first ‘Secure School’. Chalke explains that Oasis will offer a therapeutically informed education and health care based alternative to youth prison. He also recognises that "The challenge is huge...we have been given a massive responsibility. I realise that the reputation of the Ministry of Justice and the reputation of the whole of Oasis depends on this." The Oasis Secure School, which will be known as Oasis Restore, will occupy the site of the Medway Secure Training College (formerly known as Borstal) which was previously run by G4S until 2016 when a BBC Panorama documentary exposed the level of drugs and violence in the jail and the government removed their contract. Oasis Restore will open in early 2021.

References

External links
 UK website

Charities based in London
International charities
Christian charities
Organizations established in 1985
 
Founders of English schools and colleges
Organizations that combat human trafficking
International medical and health organizations
Health charities in the United Kingdom
Housing organizations
Youth work
1985 establishments in the United Kingdom